Afromelittia natalensis is a moth of the family Sesiidae. It is known from South Africa.

References

Sesiidae
Moths of Africa
Lepidoptera of Mozambique
Lepidoptera of Malawi
Lepidoptera of Zambia
Moths described in 1874
Lepidoptera of South Africa